Solar power in Iowa is limited but growing, with 137 megawatts (MW) installed by the end of 2019 and 27 MW installed during that year, ranking the state 40th among U.S. states.  Iowa also generated 0.23% of the state's total electricity production in 2019 from solar energy; an amount sufficient to power over 17,000 Iowa homes.  The state's early position as a major wind-power provider may have limited early large-scale solar investment.

Solar panels on rooftops alone can provide 20% of all electricity used in Iowa. On June 7, 2012, Sky Factory in Fairfield became the first company in the state to generate all of their electricity from solar power, with the installation of a 54 kilowatt (kW) 3500 sq. ft. solar array. Prior to that one of the largest arrays was the 15.75 kW array on the Marshalltown Public Library. Currently, a 3.8 MW array near Dubuque is the state's largest facility. By 2024, another 380 MW of generating capacity may be installed according to projections by the Solar Energy Industries Association.

Net metering is available continuously to all consumers generating up to 500 kW, one of the best policies in the country, but is given a B-grade overall because of not being available to higher-consumption users. A feed-in tariff is available for customers of the Farmers Electrical Cooperative for up to 25% of their electricity. It pays 20 cents/kWh for electricity generated, none of which can be directly used since a separate meter is required, in a parallel connection, making it a power purchase agreement instead of a feed-in tariff. The state of Iowa has proposed a feed-in tariff, in Senate bill SF 225. A separate rate applies for systems less than 20 kW and for systems more than 20 kW up to 20 MW.

Statistics

Solar farms

As of year 2020, Iowa hosts six grid-connected facilities with generating capacity larger than 1.5 MW.  The largest is the 3.8 MWAC West Dubuque Solar Garden commissioned for Alliant Energy in September, 2017.

See also

Wind power in Iowa
Solar power in the United States
Renewable energy in the United States

References

External links
Incentives and Policies
Iowa Energy Center

Energy in Iowa
Iowa